Daniel Rogov (October 30, 1935 – September 7, 2011) was an Israeli food and wine critic. The author of Rogov's Guide to Wine, the most authoritative guide to Israeli wine, as well as a columnist for both Haaretz and The Jerusalem Post, he was Israel's most influential wine critic.

Biography 
David Joroff (known by his pen name Daniel Rogov) was born in Brooklyn New York and grew up in Borough Park. After graduating from high school in the early 1960s, he moved to Paris. He began his career writing food and wine articles for American magazines and newspapers. In December 1976, he moved to Israel and wrote book and restaurant reviews for The Jerusalem Post. In 1984 he started contributing to Haaretz newspaper and had a weekly column on food and restaurants, and later on a weekly column on wine as well. In 2010 Rogov retired from his function as restaurant critic of Haaretz but continued to write about wine until his death.

Rogov died in September 2011 from lung cancer. His obituary which he wrote and posted on his website, says "This is a difficult letter to write and that because as it posted it will serve to let forum members, guests and friends know that I have died." After his death, Carmel Winery released a limited edition of brandy called Rogov Brandy in Rogov's honor.

Published works 
Rogov wrote several books on food, wine, and travel. Amongst them, Rogov's guide to Israeli wine is considered to be the authoritative guide to Israeli wines. First published in 2005, the final volume was released posthumously in 2011, and now sells about 10,000 copies a year. The bulk of the book contains Rogov's tasting notes on 2500 wines from over 150 Israeli wineries. The guide also contains a history of winemaking in Israel, discussions of Israel's wine regions and vintage years, and coverage of what makes wines kosher. In 2010 and 2011, Rogov also authored Rogov's Guide to World Kosher Wines.

Rogov is also the author of Rogues, Writers & Whores: Dining With the Rich & Infamous, in which he tells the stories of 69 foods and the personalities after whom they were named.

References

External links 
 

1935 births
2011 deaths
People from Borough Park, Brooklyn
American columnists
American emigrants to Israel
Jewish American writers
Israeli columnists
Israeli Jews
Israeli wine
Israeli writers
Wine critics
Journalists from New York City
21st-century American Jews